These are the Canadian number-one albums of 1989. The chart is compiled by Nielsen Soundscan and published by Jam! Canoe, issued every Sunday. The chart also appears in Billboard magazine as Top Canadian Albums.

See also
List of Canadian number-one singles of 1989

References

External links
Top 100 albums in Canada on Jam
Billboard Top Canadian Albums

1989
1989 record charts
1989 in Canadian music